Parke Asel Wilson (October 26, 1867 – December 20, 1934) was an American professional baseball player. He played all or part of seven seasons in Major League Baseball for the New York Giants of the National League (NL) from 1893 until 1899.

Wilson served as the team's backup catcher for majority of his playing career, first to Jack Doyle in 1893, then to Duke Farrell in 1894-95. He was the team's primary catcher in 1896, then was the backup to Jack Warner in 1897. After spending most of the 1898 season in the minor leagues with the Kansas City Blues, he returned in 1899, when he played much of his time at first base and other infield positions. He went on to play in the minors until 1906, spending the last four years in the Pacific Coast League.

Wilson died in Hermosa Beach, California at the age of 67, and is interred at Inglewood Park Cemetery in Inglewood, California.

References

External links

Major League Baseball catchers
New York Giants (NL) players
Denver Grizzlies (baseball) players
Denver Mountaineers players
Portland Gladiators players
Lincoln Rustlers players
Oakland Colonels players
Augusta Electricians players
Kansas City Blues (baseball) players
Montreal Royals players
Saint Mary's Gaels baseball coaches
Seattle Siwashes players
San Francisco Seals (baseball) managers
San Francisco Seals (baseball) players
Baseball players from Illinois
19th-century baseball players
People from Mercer County, Illinois
Burials at Inglewood Park Cemetery
1867 births
1934 deaths